Skowhegan Area High School is a public high school in Skowhegan, Maine, United States. It is part of Maine School Administrative District 54 which includes the towns of Skowhegan, Canaan, Mercer, Smithfield, Cornville, and Norridgewock.

Notable alumni
 Abner Coburn, 30th Governor of Maine (1863–64)
 Susan Clark (sailor)
 Bradlee Farrin, state legislator
 Robert Nutting (politician), state legislator
 Margaret Chase Smith, American politician, first woman to serve in both the United States House of Representatives and United States Senate

Notable faculty
 Marti Stevens (educator)
 Chandler Woodcock, state legislator

References

Skowhegan, Maine
Public high schools in Maine
Schools in Somerset County, Maine